The River Complex 2021 was a wildfire complex burning in Klamath National Forest in Siskiyou County, California in the United States. The complex comprises over 20 wildfires that started as a result of lightning strikes during a series of thunderstorms in late July 2021. The largest fires in the complex were the Haypress–Summer Fire and the Cronan Fire.

Events

July

A series of late July thunderstorms created lightning strikes that, over a series of days, started 29 wildfires on the western side of Klamath National Forest in Siskiyou County, California. Twenty-five of those fires started in the Salmon-Scott River Ranger District, resulting in the creation of the River Complex to manage the fires. The first fire was reported on July 30, 2021, around 7:00 AM, burning in timber and brush. The largest fire, as of July 31, was the Cronan Fire, burning 3.5 miles northeast of Sawyers Bar. At the time, it was reported to have burned . Five of the 25 fires were contained and two were declared "out" by fire crews, including the Bally Fire near Buckhorn Bally Lookout and the Lime Fire near Lime Gulch. On Saturday, July 31, two more fires were reported: a .25 acre fire (Glade Fire) on Sterling Mountain and a tree fire in the Slater Fire burn scar.

August
By August 2, a more robust evaluation of the fires burning in the Complex was available. Thirteen fires remained actively burning, including the three largest fires:

Haypress Fire at  burning two miles southeast of Shadow Creek Campground. This fire caused the evacuations of Taylor Creek and warnings to be put in place for Forks of Salmon and Sawyers Bar.
Summer Fire at  burning east of China Gulch Trailhead, near Cecil Lake. This resulted in the evacuation of the trail and immediate area and an evacuation center being opened in Etna, California.
Cronan Fire at  burning 3.5 miles from Sawyers Bar in Cronan Gulch.

Smokejumpers were brought in to tackle fires in remote areas, including the  Packers Fire burning on Packers Peak in the Trinity Alps Wilderness and the  Island Fire near Lake of the Island in Marble Mountain Wilderness. The next day, on August 3, evacuations were put in place for Cecilville and Caribou Road. Evacuation warnings were put in place for areas surrounding Cecilville. Limited firefighting resources, due to other larger fires burning in the region, resulted in smaller fires being left to burn out and a focus on structure protection. The number of fires in the complex was increased to 22. The entire complex totaled  and was three percent contained. Additional evacuation orders were put in place for Summerville and Petersburg. A portion of Callahan-Cecilville Road was closed.

Current evacuations and closures

Evacuations

The following areas are under mandatory evacuation and should leave now:
Caribou Road
Cecilville
Petersburg
Summerville
Taylor Creek Road

The following areas are under evacuation warning and should be prepared to evacuation if asked:
Black Bear
Blue Ridge
Eddy Gulch Road
Forks of Salmon
Godfried
Sawyers Bar
Uncle Sam Mine

An evacuation center is open at Etna Fire Hall in Etna, California.

Road closures
The following roads are closed:
Callahan-Cecilville Road is closed from approximately 1 mile west of the community of Callahan to Cecilville.

Recreational closures

The following areas are closed:
China Gulch Trailhead

Impact

Smoke from the River Complex impacted air quality in the San Francisco Bay Area from August 6 through August 8. The air quality levels prompted an air quality advisory for the area.

The Summer Fire resulted in an evacuation of the entire China Gulch Trailhead and a closure of the trail on August 2.

References

External links

2021 California wildfires
July 2021 events in the United States
Wildfires in Siskiyou County, California
Wildfires in Trinity County, California
Klamath National Forest